Damn usually refers to damnation, a condemnation, usually by a god; frequently used as a profanity.

Damn may also refer to:

Music
 Damn (band), a funk-rock and Latin band

Albums
 Damn (Kendrick Lamar album), a 2017 album by Kendrick Lamar
 Damn! (Jimmy Smith album), a 1995 album by Jimmy Smith
 Damn, by Emperor Penguin

Songs
 "Damn!" (song), a 2003 song by YoungBloodZ
 "Damn", a song by 112 from Pleasure & Pain
 "Damn", a song by Fabolous from Street Dreams
 "Damn", a song by Girls Aloud from Tangled Up
 "Damn" (Joyryde song), a 2016 song by Joyryde featuring Freddie Gibbs
 "Damn", a song by K. Michelle from Rebellious Soul
 "Damn", a song by LeAnn Rimes from Twisted Angel
 "Damn", a song by Matchbox Twenty from Yourself or Someone Like You
 "Damn", a song by Shawnna from Block Music
 "Damn", a song by The Matrix, featuring Katy Perry, from The Matrix
 "Damn (Should've Treated U Right)", a pop/R&B single by So Plush featuring Ja Rule

Science and technology
 Distributed architecture for mobile navigation, a mobile robot architecture
 dAmn, a chat client for the online community DeviantArt
 Diaminomaleonitrile, an organic compound

See also
 
 
 Dam (disambiguation)
 Dammit (disambiguation)
 Damned (disambiguation)
 Damnation (disambiguation)